The 1974–75 FIBA European Champions Cup was the 18th edition of the European top-tier level professional basketball club competition FIBA European Champions Cup (now called EuroLeague). The Final was held at the Arena Deurne, in Antwerp, Belgium, on April 10, 1975. In a reprise of a previous year's final, Ignis Varese defeated Real Madrid, by a result of 79–65.

Competition system

 24 teams (European national domestic league champions, plus the then current title holders), playing in a tournament system, played knock-out rounds on a home and away basis. The aggregate score of both games decided the winner.
 The twelve teams qualified for the Quarterfinals were divided into two groups of six. Every team played against the other five in its group in consecutive home-and-away matches, so that every two of these games counted as a single win or defeat (point difference being a decisive factor there). In case of a tie between two or more teams after this group stage, the following criteria were used: 1) one-to-one games between the teams; 2) basket average; 3) individual wins and defeats.
 The group winners and the runners-up of the Quarterfinal Group Stage qualified for the Semifinals. The final was played at a predetermined venue.

First round

|}

Second round

*Partizani Tirana withdrew before the first leg, so Balkan Botevgrad went through with a walkover.

Automatically qualified to the group stage
 Real Madrid (title holder)
 Ignis Varese
 Berck
 Zadar
 CSKA Moscow

Quarterfinals group stage
The quarterfinals were played with a round-robin system, in which every Two Game series (TGS) constituted as one game for the record.

*CSKA Moscow withdrew before the group stage for political reasons. Therefore, all the scheduled games of the Soviet team were considered forfeits (2–0) for their rivals, although they were not counted in the final standing of the group.

Semifinals

Final
April 10, Arena Deurne, Antwerp

|}

Awards

FIBA European Champions Cup Finals Top Scorer
 Bob Morse ( Ignis Varese)

References

External links
1974–75 FIBA European Champions Cup
 1974–75 FIBA European Champions Cup
 Champions Cup 1974–75 Line-ups and Stats

EuroLeague seasons
FIBA